The 2013–14 Utah Runnin' Utes men's basketball team represented the University of Utah during the 2013–14 NCAA Division I men's basketball season. They played their home games at the Jon M. Huntsman Center in Salt Lake City, Utah and were a member of the Pac-12 Conference. The Utes were led by their third year head coach Larry Krystkowiak. Their last game was played in the first round of the NIT, where they lost to the Saint Mary's Gaels.

Roster

Schedule and results 
All home games and conference road games will be televised on Fox Sports 1, ESPN Networks, or Pac-12 Networks. The game against Grand Canyon will not be televised by the Pac-12 due to an ongoing dispute over for-profit universities competing in Division I athletics. All games will be broadcast on the radio and streamed online by KALL 700 Sports.

|-
!colspan=12 style="background:#CC0000; color:white;"| Exhibition

|-
!colspan=12 style="background:#CC0000; color:white;"| Non-conference regular season

|-
!colspan=12 style="background:#CC0000;"| Pac-12 regular season

|-
!colspan=12 style="background:#CC0000;"| Pac-12 tournament

|-
!colspan=12 style="background:#CC0000;"| NIT

See also
2013–14 Utah Utes women's basketball team

References 

Utah
Utah Utes men's basketball seasons
Utah
Utah Utes
Utah Utes